The 2013–14 HC Lev Praha season is the second season for Prague based club in Kontinental Hockey League.

Standings

Schedule and results

Pre-season
Pre-season took part in August and September.

Regular season

Final roster 
Updated April 7, 2014.

|}

Roster changes

Draft picks

References

HC Lev Praha
Praha